The Men's 56 kilograms weightlifting event at the 2012 Summer Olympics was held in ExCeL London on 29 July.

Summary
Total score was the sum of the lifter's best result in each of the snatch and the clean and jerk, with three lifts allowed for each lift.  In case of a tie, the lighter lifter won; if still tied, the lifter who took the fewest attempts to achieve the total score won.  Lifters without a valid snatch score did not perform the clean and jerk.

On 22 December 2018, it was announced that Azerbaijan's Valentin Hristov, London 2012 Olympic bronze medalist, had tested positive for performance-enhancing drugs. In March 2019, Hristov was disqualified after the re-analysis of his samples were positive for oralturinabol. Medals were reallocated.

Schedule
All times are British Summer Time (UTC+01:00)

Records

Results

New records

References 

Results 

Weightlifting at the 2012 Summer Olympics
Men's events at the 2012 Summer Olympics

no:Vektløfting under Sommer-OL 2012 – Menn 77 kg